Richland Township is one of the seventeen townships of Logan County, Ohio, United States. As of the 2010 census, the population was 2,482.

Geography
Located in the northern part of the county, it borders the following townships:
McDonald Township, Hardin County - north
Taylor Creek Township, Hardin County - northeast
Rushcreek Township - east
McArthur Township - south
Washington Township - southwest
Stokes Township - west
Roundhead Township, Hardin County - northwest

The village of Belle Center is located in northern Richland Township, and the unincorporated community of Northwood lies in the township's southeast, along the border with McArthur Township.

The eastern part of Indian Lake is located in western Richland Township.

Name and history
Richland Township was organized in 1844. It is one of twelve Richland Townships statewide.

Government
The township is governed by a three-member board of trustees, who are elected in November of odd-numbered years to a four-year term beginning on the following January 1. Two are elected in the year after the presidential election and one is elected in the year before it. There is also an elected township fiscal officer, who serves a four-year term beginning on April 1 of the year after the election, which is held in November of the year before the presidential election. Vacancies in the fiscal officership or on the board of trustees are filled by the remaining trustees.

In the elections of November 2007, David Leiter and Gretchen Anderson were elected without opposition to the positions of township trustee and township fiscal officer respectively.

Transportation
Important highways in Richland Township include State Routes 117, 235, 273, 366, and 368.

The township is the location of the Bickham Covered Bridge, which carries County Road 38 over the South Fork of the Miami River. Built in 1877 and refurbished in 1959, it employs the Howe truss design.

References

External links
County website
County and township map of Ohio
Detailed Logan County map

Townships in Logan County, Ohio
Townships in Ohio
1844 establishments in Ohio
Populated places established in 1844